Mingyang may refer to: 

 Mingyang Subdistrict, Zhuanghe, Liaoning, China
 Mingyang Wind Power, the largest Chinese wind turbine manufacturer